The discography of American singer Brandon Flowers, consists of two studio albums, and seven singles.

Flamingo, Flowers debut solo album, was released in September 2010 and immediately reached number-one on the UK Albums Chart and was later certified Gold. Lead single "Crossfire" reached the top ten on the UK Singles Chart and was later certified Silver.

Second solo album, The Desired Effect was released in May 2015 and also immediately reached number-one on the UK Albums Chart before being certified Gold. Later that year, Flowers featured on closing track "Superheated" on the New Order album Music Complete, which reached number two on the UK Albums Chart.

Studio albums

Singles

As lead artist

As featured artist

Notes

Additional songwriting credit(s)

Music videos

Filmography/Appearances

References

Discographies of American artists
Rock music group discographies
Discography